L.S.T. is a studio album by Shugo Tokumaru. It was originally released via Compare Notes Records on August 25, 2005 in Japan. In 2006, it was re-released via Active Suspension in Europe, as well as via Lil' Chief Records in New Zealand.

Critical reception
Jesse Jarnow of AllMusic gave the album 4 stars out of 5, saying, "[Tokumaru's] electro-acoustic micro-miniatures are joyous contraptions, layers and textures slathered on with careful abandon, melodies separated between a dizzying array of guitars, pianos, chimes, whistles, glockenspiels, and stop-time rhythms." He added, "Thanks to the constant instrumentation changes, the songs stay fresh, retaining a bedroom pop vibe despite their utterly obsessive arrangements."

In 2010, Cokemachineglow placed it at number 96 on the "Top 100 Albums of the 2000s" list.

Track listing

References

External links
 

2005 albums
Shugo Tokumaru albums
Lil' Chief Records albums